Richard David Shepherd CBE FRSA FGRA (25 April 1931 – 19 September 2017) was a British artist and one of the world's most outspoken conservationists. He was most famous for his paintings of steam locomotives (he owned a number of them) and wildlife, although he also often painted aircraft, portraits (notably The Queen Mother) and landscapes. His work has been extremely popular since the 1960s in limited edition print reproduction and poster form, as well as other media such as Wedgwood limited edition plates.  He published five books about his art, including an autobiography.

Life and work 

David Shepherd was born in Hendon, London, England. As a child he lived in Totteridge, North London and he won a children's painting competition in a magazine called Nursery World when he was eight years old. He then attended Stowe School in Buckinghamshire. Upon leaving school he travelled to Kenya with the hope of becoming a game warden, but was rejected as having "no talent whatsoever". He returned to the UK but was rejected by the Slade School of Fine Art in London. However, he was taken in by the artist Robin Goodwin who trained him for three years.

Neal Brown said in Frieze magazine: "David Shepherd is one of the most financially rewarded painters in the UK... Shepherd has brought pleasure to millions, as seen on the many table mats, posters and commemorative plates that bear his work." David Gower said, "There is a sense of the atmosphere of the African bush that emanates from all his work."

Conservationist
Shepherd became interested in conservation during an early expedition into the African bush, where he discovered a poisoned water hole with 255 dead zebra. He had become an outspoken world-known campaigner, and devoted much of his time to this. He was also a steam railway enthusiast, but said in a letter to the UK's The Railway Magazine, "you can always build another steam loco but you can't build another tiger." One of his best known paintings, Tiger in The Sun, was painted in 1977. His paintings are not only prized by art collectors but have also raised huge sums for conservation. His first major fund-raising success was a work titled Tiger Fire which raised £127,000 for Indira Gandhi’s Operation Tiger in 1973. Shephard was also known for his paintings of elephants and among his most well known works were The Ivory is Theirs and Wise Old Elephant.

He was the founder of the David Shepherd Wildlife Foundation and was made an Officer of the Order of the British Empire (OBE) in the 1980 New Year Honours list "for services to the conservation of wildlife." He was appointed a Commander of the Order of the British Empire (CBE) in the 2008 Birthday Honours list for services to charity and wildlife conservation.

Steam enthusiast

Shepherd owned a number of steam locomotives. He bought both 9F Black Prince 92203 and Class 4MT No.75029 The Green Knight direct from British Railways, where he had connections from painting various scenes for them. No.75029 The Green Knight was sold to the North Yorkshire Moors Railway to finance Black Princes overhaul, then in 2015 Black Prince was sold to the North Norfolk Railway.

All the African locomotives he acquired were British-built. In South Africa the 15F (Nº 3052), presented to him by Spoornet in 1991, is stored at Sandstone Estates in Ficksburg. It has carried various names, including City of Germiston and, more recently, his wife's name, Avril. It was moved to Ficksburg in light steam from Pietermaritzburg by Friends of the Rail (a Pretoria-based heritage steam association) in April 2003 and it steamed again in April 2006, when Friends of the Rail operated it for several trips between Ficksburg and Kommandonek with Shepherd on board. He also owned two Zambian locomotives from the Mulobezi Railway, given to him by then President Kenneth Kaunda. One is still in the railway museum in Livingstone, Zambia, the other was located on the Sandstone Estates complex in South Africa. Shepherd donated it, along with a coach, to the National Railway Museum in York in the UK, where it is undergoing restoration.

Shepherd was involved in founding a heritage steam railway in the UK, the East Somerset Railway, where the signal box at Cranmore Station has become a small gallery displaying his work. He was also president of the "Railway Ramblers".

Personal life and death
Shepherd's parents gave him a Victorian cottage, with more than an acre of land, in Frensham, Surrey, next to their own house, to encourage him to get engaged to his future wife Avril. The couple had four daughters and lived in West Sussex. Their daughter Mandy is also a wildlife and military artist.

On 20 September 2017 the Surrey-based David Shepherd Wildlife Foundation (DSWF) announced that Shepherd had died, on 19 September, after a 10-week fight in hospital with Parkinson's disease. The charity paid tribute to his devotion to the animals he painted, with chief executive Karen Botha saying, "David’s passion for wildlife and the role of man in its demise infuriated and inspired him. He was dedicated, tenacious and outspoken, a champion of animals and the people who worked to protect them. He will be greatly missed."

Julian Birley, chairman of the North Norfolk Railway, said: "It is the end of an era. A great man who will forever be credited as one of this country’s greatest pioneers of railway preservation. And in so doing brought pleasure to hundreds of thousands of people."

References

Further reading
  Describes house formerly owned by Shepherd and his modifications to it.
  mentions "dedicated railway artists such as Terence Cuneo or David Shepherd"
  Provides a guide of current insurance values for David Shepherd's signed limited edition prints.

External links
 David Shepherd (Guild of Railway artists)
 David Shepherd Wildlife Foundation for conservation projects and single largest source of works for sale by David Shepherd
 David Shepherd, wildlife artist – obituary at telegraph.co.uk
 View the upcoming exhibition at Gladwell & Patterson in January 2019

1931 births
2017 deaths
British artists
People educated at Stowe School
Commanders of the Order of the British Empire
People from Hendon
British railway artists
British people associated with Heritage Railways
British conservationists
Neurological disease deaths in England
Deaths from Parkinson's disease